Amphibologyne is a genus of flowering plants belonging to the family Boraginaceae.

Its native range is Mexico.

Species:

Amphibologyne mexicana

References

Boraginaceae
Boraginaceae genera